Jessica Lindell-Vikarby (born 7 February 1984) is a retired Swedish World Cup alpine ski racer.

Born in Huddinge, Stockholm County, she made her World Cup debut in October 2002, and has two World Cup victories and seven podiums. Lindell-Vikarby has competed in three Olympics and six World Championships.

On 14 July 2015, she announced her retirement from alpine skiing.

World Cup results

Season standings

Race podiums
 2 wins – (1 SG, 1 GS)
 7 podiums – (3 SG, 4 GS)

References

External links
 
 Jessica Lindell-Vikarby World Cup standings at the International Ski Federation
 
 
 Jessica Lindell-Vikarby at Rossignol.com
Jessica Lindell-Vikarby at the Swedish Olympic Committee (SOK) 
  
 

1984 births
Living people
People from Huddinge Municipality
Olympic alpine skiers of Sweden
Alpine skiers at the 2006 Winter Olympics
Alpine skiers at the 2010 Winter Olympics
Swedish female alpine skiers
Alpine skiers at the 2014 Winter Olympics
Sportspeople from Stockholm County
21st-century Swedish women